John Davie (1640–1710) was an English merchant from Bideford, Devon.

John Davie may also refer to:

Sir John Davie, 1st Baronet (1588–1654), MP for Tiverton 1621–1622
Sir John Davie, 2nd Baronet (1612–1678), MP for Tavistock 1661
Sir John Davie, 3rd Baronet (1660–1692) MP for Saltash 1679–1685, of the Davie baronets
Sir John Davie, 5th Baronet (died 1727), of the Davie baronets
Sir John Davie, 6th Baronet (1700–1737), of the Davie baronets
Sir John Davie, 7th Baronet (1734–1792), of the Davie baronets
Sir John Davie, 8th Baronet (1772–1803), of the Davie baronets
Sir John Davie, 9th Baronet (1798–1824), of the Davie baronets
John Davie (Master of Sidney Sussex College, Cambridge) (1777–1813), Master of Sidney Sussex 1811–1813
John Davie (activist) (1800–1891)
 Sir John Ferguson Davie, 2nd Baronet (1830–1907), British politician, and British Army officer
Jock Davie (1913–1994), Scottish footballer
John Davie (British Army officer) (1921–2015)

See also
Jon Davie (born 1954), guitarist
John Davy (disambiguation)
John Davey (disambiguation)
John Davies (disambiguation)
Davie (disambiguation)